Milagros Bernardo, better known by her screen name Luz Valdez-Paje (born September 9, 1940) is a Filipina actress.

The Valdez screen name was given to her in 1958 by Narcisa de Leon, producer and co-founder of LVN Pictures, as she felt that Milagros Bernardo was too long and wanted her new contract player to have a name that would be easily remembered.

Filmography

Television

Movies

References

External links

1940 births
Filipino film actresses
Filipino television actresses
Living people
People from Olongapo
Actresses from Zambales
20th-century Filipino actresses
21st-century Filipino actresses
GMA Network personalities